Charles Henry Adderley (16 September 1912 – 28 February 1985) was an English first-class cricketer. He was a right-handed batsman and a right-arm medium-pace bowler who played for Warwickshire. He was born in King's Heath, Birmingham and died in Moseley.

Adderley represented Warwickshire during the 1946 season, though he failed to impress with either bat or ball, scoring just 27 runs in five first-class matches.

Adderley had played for the National Fire Service in 1944 and 1945.

1912 births
1985 deaths
English cricketers
Warwickshire cricketers
Cricketers from Birmingham, West Midlands
English cricketers of 1919 to 1945
English cricketers of 1946 to 1968
Civil Defence Service personnel